An oxyhydride is a mixed anion compound containing both oxide O2− and hydride ions H−. These compounds may be unexpected as the hydrogen and oxygen could be expected to react to form water. But if the metals making up the cations are electropositive enough, and the conditions are reducing enough, solid materials can be made that combine hydrogen and oxygen in the negative ion role.

Production
The first oxyhydride to be discovered was lanthanum oxyhydride, a 1982 discovery. It was made by heating lanthanum oxide in an atmosphere of hydrogen at 900 °C. However heating transition metal oxides with hydrogen, usually results in reduction to the metal.

Topochemical synthesis retains the basic structure of the parent compound, and only does the minimum rearrangements of atoms to convert to the final product. Topotactic reactions retain the original crystal symmetry. Reactions at lower temperatures do not distorub the existing structure. Oxyhydrides in a topochemical synthesis can be produced by heating oxides with sodium hydride NaH or calcium hydride CaH2 at temperatures from 200–600 °C. TiH2 or LiH can also be used as an agent to introduce hydride. If calcium hydroxide or sodium hydroxide is formed, it might be able to be washed away. However for some starting oxides, this kind of hydride reduction might just yield an oxygen deficient oxide.

Reactions under hot high pressure hydrogen can result from heating hydrides with oxides. A suitable seal for the lid on the container is required, and one such substance is sodium chloride.

Oxyhydrides all contain an alkali, alkaline earth, or rare earth metal, which are needed in order to put electronic charge on hydrogen.

Properties
The hydrogen bonding in oxyhydrides can be covalent, metallic, and ionic bonding, dependent on the metals present in the compound.
Oxyhydrides lose their hydrogen less than the pure metal hydrides.
The hydrogen in oxyhydrides is much more exchangeable. For example oxynitrides can be made at much lower temperatures by heating the oxyhydride in ammonia or nitrogen gas (say around 400 °C rather than 900 °C required for an oxide) Acidic attack can replace the hydrogen, for example moderate heating in hydrogen fluoride yields compounds containing oxide, fluoride and hydride ions. (oxyfluorohydride)  The hydrogen is more thermolabile, and can be lost by heating yielding a reduced valence metal compound.

Changing the ratio of hydrogen and oxygen can modify electrical or magnetic properties. Then band gap can be altered. The hydride atom can be mobile in a compound undergoing electron coupled hydride transfer. The hydride ion is highly polarisable, so it presence raised the dielectric constant and refractive index.

Some oxyhydrides have photocatalytic capability. For example BaTiO2.5H0.5 can function as a catalyst for ammonia production from hydrogen and nitrogen.

The hydride ion is quite variable in size, ranging from 130 to 153 pm.

The hydride ion actually does not only have a −1 charge, but will have a charge dependent on its environment, so it is often written as Hδ−. In oxyhydrides, the hydride ion is much more compressible than the other atoms in compounds. Hydride is the only anion with no π-orbital, so if it is incorporated into a compound, it acts as a π-blocker, reducing dimensionality of the solid.

Oxyhydride structures with heavy metals cannot be properly studied with X-ray diffraction, as hydrogen hardly has any effect on X-rays. Neutron diffraction can be used to observe hydrogen, but not if there are heavy neutron absorbers like Eu, Sm, Gd, Dy in the material.

List

Three or more anions

References

Hydrides
Oxides
Mixed anion compounds